The 1998 Leeds City Council election took place on 7 May 1998 to elect members of City of Leeds Metropolitan Borough Council in West Yorkshire, England. One third of the council, alongside a vacancy in Wortley (following Fabian Hamilton's election as Leeds North East MP) were up for election.

The Labour party stayed in overall control of the council. Overall turnout in the election was 24.66%.

Election result

This result had the following consequences for the total number of seats on the council after the elections:

Ward results

By-elections between 1998 and 1999

References

1998 English local elections
1998
1990s in Leeds